Dayuan station can refer to:
Dayuan station (Chengdu Metro), a metro station in Chengdu, China
Dayuan metro station, a metro station in Taoyuan, Taiwan